Margaret Howard, 2nd Baroness Strathcona and Mount Royal (née Smith; 17 January 1854 - 18 August 1926) was a British peer and medical doctor.

She inherited the title from her father, the first Baron, the title having been created with a special remainder to allow female succession.  In 1888, she married Robert Jared Bliss Howard OBE FRCS (1859–1921), son of Robert Palmer Howard (1823–1889), Dean of Medicine at McGill University.

She was succeeded by her son Donald Howard, 3rd Baron Strathcona and Mount Royal.

She is buried in Highgate Cemetery (East), London.

References

External links

1854 births
1926 deaths
19th-century Canadian physicians
19th-century British medical doctors
Daughters of barons
Barons in the Peerage of the United Kingdom
Hereditary women peers